Chub Cay Airport is an airport in Chub Cay in the Berry Islands in The Bahamas . The airport actually lies in Frazers Hog Cay.

Airlines and destinations

References

External links
Chub Cay

Airports in the Bahamas
Berry Islands